Jorge Ruiz Ojeda (born 27 September 1995), known as Koke Vegas or simply Koke, is a Spanish footballer who plays as a goalkeeper for USL Championship club San Diego Loyal.

Club career
Koke was born in Antequera, Málaga, Andalusia, and represented the clubs Antequera, Málaga, Sevilla and CD Puerto Malagueño as a youth. On 16 April 2011, he made his senior debut for the former, coming on as a late substitute in a 0–0 Tercera División home draw against CD Huétor Tájar at the age of just 15.

In 2011, after having trials at Villarreal and Aston Villa, Koke joined Espanyol and returned to youth football. He was promoted to the reserves in 2013, in the Segunda División B.

On 2 July 2015 Koke signed for another reserve team, Levante UD B also in the third tier. He made his professional debut on 4 September 2016, starting in a 1–1 away draw against Gimnàstic de Tarragona in the Segunda División.

On 30 August 2017, Koke was loaned to third-tier club Alcoyano for a year. The following 16 January, his loan was cut short and he was definitely included in the first team. 

Koke made his La Liga debut on 19 May 2018, keeping a clean sheet in a 2–4 away loss against Celta de Vigo. On 16 July 2019, after spending the campaign as a third-choice behind Oier Olazábal and Aitor Fernández, he was loaned to second division club Deportivo La Coruña for a year.

On 31 January 2020, as Oier left for Espanyol, Koke was recalled by Levante. He was initially a backup to Fernández, but was overtaken by fellow youth graduate Dani Cárdenas during the 2020–21 campaign.

On 1 February 2021, Koke moved to second division side RCD Mallorca on loan for the remainder of the season. On 31 August, he terminated his deal with the Granotes.

On 7 January 2022, Koke moved to second division US side San Diego Loyal, who compete in the USL Championship.

Career statistics

Club

References

External links

1995 births
Living people
People from Antequera
Sportspeople from the Province of Málaga
Spanish footballers
Footballers from Andalusia
Association football goalkeepers
La Liga players
Segunda División players
Segunda División B players
Tercera División players
Antequera CF footballers
RCD Espanyol B footballers
Atlético Levante UD players
Levante UD footballers
CD Alcoyano footballers
Deportivo de La Coruña players
RCD Mallorca players
San Diego Loyal SC players